National Route 316 is a national highway of Japan connecting the towns of Nagato and San'yō-Onoda in Yamaguchi prefecture, with a total length of 40.2 km (24.98 mi).

References

National highways in Japan
Roads in Yamaguchi Prefecture